Battle of Tangier may refer to:

 Battle of Tangier (1437)
 Battle of Tangier (1664) 
 Great Siege of Tangier